Kostiuchenko or Kostyuchenko is a surname. Notable people with the surname include:

 Elena Kostyuchenko (born 1987), Russian journalist and gay-rights activist
 Serguei Kostiuchenko (born 1965), Belarusian military conductor

Slavic-language surnames